The Ginetta Junior Championship is a one-make racing series based in the United Kingdom. From the 2010 season teams use the Ginetta G40, having previously used the Ginetta G20.

The cars use sealed Ford Zetec 1.8-litre engines, and feature tubular steel chassis, fully integral FIA approved roll cages and fibre-glass shells which ensure safe, controlled racing.

Race weekend
Meetings are usually made up of two 15-minute races. The starting grids for the two races are determined by a 15-minute qualifying session. Each driver's fastest lap in this session sets their starting position for the first race, whilst their second fastest lap sets their starting position for race two.

Champions

Notable alumni

See also
 Ginetta GT Supercup

References

External links
Junior Championship at Ginetta Cars
Ginetta Junior Update

Auto racing series in the United Kingdom
One-make series
Sports car racing series
Junior Championship